Shin Chang-moo (Hanja:, ; born 17 September 1992) is a South Korean footballer who plays as midfielder for Gangwon FC in K League 1.

Club career
Sin Chang-moo joined Daegu FC in January 2014. He made his professional debut goal in the league match against FC Anyang on 23 July 2016.

References

External links 

1992 births
Living people
Association football midfielders
South Korean footballers
Daegu FC players
Gimcheon Sangmu FC players
Gangwon FC players
K League 1 players
K League 2 players
People educated at John Paul College (Brisbane)